Alessandro Magnoli Bocchi (born 25 April 1968), is an Italian economist and manager.

Biography
Born in 1968 in Cremona, Italy, he graduated from Liceo Classico "Daniele Manin". In 1986 he moved to Milan, Italy to attend Bocconi University. From 1992 to 1995 he lived in Barcelona, Spain where he studied and taught at ESADE and worked at Pirelli. In 1995 he moved to Washington, DC, USA to work at the Inter-American Development Bank. In 1999 he joined Harvard University as a Research Associate and earned a Ph.D. from ESADE. In 2001 he returned to Washington, DC, recruited by The World Bank YP Program. In 2008 he joined the Kuwait China Investment Company in Kuwait.

Career
Currently he is Chief Economist, member of the Management Team and the Investment Committee at the Kuwait China Investment Company, where he focuses on international investments and economic research.

Previously, he was: 1) Senior Economist at The World Bank, working in East Asia (based in Bangkok from 2004 to 2006), Africa, Middle East, and Eastern Europe in the fields of macroeconomics, growth, public finance, infrastructure and energy; 2) Research Associate at Harvard University, School of Public Health, where he focused on financing and policy reform in Africa and Latin America; 3) Economist at the Inter-American Development Bank, concentrating on public policy in Latin America and the Caribbean; 4) Assistant Manager at Pirelli/Spain in the Organization and Information Systems Department; and 5) Teaching Assistant at ESADE/Department of Economics.

His main interests include macroeconomics, growth, fiscal policy, public finance, investment, welfare theory, and development.

He holds a B.A. in economics and management from Bocconi University, Milan, a CEMS Master in International Management from Bocconi University/ESADE, and a Ph.D. in economics and management from ESADE, Barcelona.
In 1993 he became Dottore Commercialista, Italian Diploma for Qualified Chartered Accountant, Fiscal and Business consultant.

Works

Books
 In 2003, he published What do you mean?, a book on efficiency and equity in social services delivery, by IADB/Johns Hopkins University Press.
 In 2007, he co-authored The World Bank, a book in Italian by Il Mulino.
 In 2008, he co-authored Reshaping Economic Geography in East Asia, a book by the World Bank.

Selected papers
 Rising growth, declining investment : the puzzle of the Philippines. English (World Bank Working Paper Series);
 Reaching the millennium development goals : Mauritania should care. English (World Bank Working Paper Series);
 NHA in Latin America and Caribbean. Concepts, Results and Policy Uses. English and Spanish (IADB/INDES Working Paper Series); and
 Mind the Gap. Suggestions on How to Bridge Gender Gaps in Developing Regions. English and Spanish (IADB/INDES Working Paper Series).

References

External links 

 World Economic Forum
 Roubini Global Economics – Economonitor
 EconPapers
 East Asia & Pacific on the rise – World Bank Blog
 La Voce

1968 births
Living people
Harvard University staff
Bocconi University alumni
ESADE alumni
Italian economists
World Bank people
Writers from Cremona